Cathedral of the Resurrection or Resurrection Cathedral may refer to:

 Cathedral of the Resurrection, Ikageng, a religious building in Ikageng in Northwest Province, South Africa
 Cathedral Church of the Resurrection, an Anglican cathedral in the heart of Lahore, Pakistan
 Resurrection Cathedral, Korçë, an Albanian Orthodox church in Korçë, Albania
 Resurrection Cathedral, Tirana, an Albanian Orthodox church situated in the center of Tirana, Albania
 Holy Resurrection Cathedral, a cathedral of the Japanese Orthodox Church, in Chiyoda, Tokyo

See also 

 Cathedral of the Resurrection of Christ (disambiguation)
 Church of the Resurrection (disambiguation)
 Holy Resurrection Church (disambiguation)